1824 election may refer to:
1824 French legislative election
1824 United States presidential election
1824 United States House of Representatives elections